The Cathedral Church of St Columba in Oban is the seat of the Roman Catholic Bishop of Argyll and the Isles and mother church of the Diocese of Argyll and the Isles. The cathedral is located on the sea front at the northern end of Oban.

History
The cathedral was designed in the Neo-Gothic style by the architect Sir Giles Gilbert Scott, the foundation stone being laid in 1932 and the building completed in 1952.  It is a Category A listed building. The work was partially funded by money raised by the diocese in the USA, Canada and Ireland. It is constructed from pink Peterhead and blue Inverawe granite.

In the Middle Ages the cathedral of the diocese of Argyll was north of Oban on the island of Lismore. Dedicated to St Moluag, Lismore Cathedral is now a Church of Scotland parish church.

See also
List of Category A listed buildings in Argyll and Bute
List of post-war Category A listed buildings in Scotland

References

External links

St Columba's Cathedral Website

Religion in Oban
Churches in Argyll and Bute
Columba
Category A listed buildings in Argyll and Bute
Listed cathedrals in Scotland